The Adelaide Cabaret Festival is an annual  arts festival featuring cabaret held in the South Australian capital of Adelaide. It has been held in June each year since 2001, with the exception of 2020 owing to the COVID-19 pandemic in Australia, when an online event was presented on Facebook.

History
Adelaide Cabaret Festival emerged during a period of change and uncertainty. During the late 1990s the number of big stage musicals was in decline across the country. Frank Ford approached then Arts Minister, Diana Laidlaw, who committed funding to establish the first cabaret festival at the Adelaide Festival Centre.

The first festival took place in May 2001 and featured Australian jazz musician James Morrison, musical satirist Phil Scott, and Australian musical theatre star Caroline O’Connor (a late replacement for Nina Simone). The festival proved successful, both critically and commercially, and the state government committed to a further three years of funding. The inaugural festival director was Julia Holt.

Description
The Festival starts on the Friday of the Queen's Birthday long weekend each June and is hosted by the Adelaide Festival Centre and runs for about two weeks. It is the biggest cabaret festival in the world.

Festival directors
Julia Holt (2001–2008)
David Campbell (2009–2011)
Kate Ceberano (2012–2014)
Barry Humphries (2015)
Ali McGregor and Eddie Perfect (2016–2017)
Ali McGregor (2018)
Julia Zemiro (2019–2020)
Alan Cumming (2021)

Festival dates

2002: 7 – 23 June
2003: 6 – 22 June
2004: 11 – 26 June
2005: 10 – 25 June
2006: 9 – 24 June
2007: 8 – 23 June
2008: 6 – 14 June
2009: 5 – 20 June
2010: 11 – 26 June
2011: 11 – 25 June
2012: 8 – 23 June
2013: 7 – 22 June
2014: 5 – 20 June
2015: 5 – 20 June
2016: 10 – 25 June
2017: 9 – 24 June
2018: 8 – 23 June
2019: 7 – 22 June
2020: 5 – 20 June 2020 (delivered via Facebook, dubbed Bite-Sized & Home Delivered) 
2021: 11 – 26 June

Past acts
Artists featured in past festivals includeDame Edna Everage (AUS), Kristin Chenoweth (USA), Alan Cumming (SCT), Idina Menzel (USA), Dita Von Teese (USA), Megan Hilty (USA) Lea Salonga (PHI), Cassandra Wilson (USA), Olivia Newton-John (AUS), Molly Ringwald (USA), Lenny Henry (UK), Ben Vereen (USA), Mary Wilson (USA), Tim Minchin (AUS), Natalie Cole (USA), Camille O’Sullivan (IRE), Paul Kelly (AUS), Bernadette Peters (USA), Stephen Schwartz (USA), Eddie Perfect (AUS), Rhonda Burchmore (AUS), Micheline Van Hautem (BEL), iOTA (AUS), Lanie Lane (AUS), Caroline Nin (FRA), Michael Feinstein (USA), Mandy Patinkin (USA) and Anthony Warlow (AUS).

References

External links

Cabaret
Performing arts in Adelaide